Furniture is the fourth and most recent EP released by American post-hardcore band Fugazi. It was recorded in January and February 2001, the same time that the band was recording their last album, The Argument, and released in October 2001 on 7" and on CD.

The songs "Furniture" and "Hello Morning" date back to the late 1980s, "Furniture" having been performed at the band's first show in 1987. Portions of "Number 5" originated in "Turkish Disco", a song recorded as a demo in 1997 and released on the Instrument Soundtrack in 1999.

Track listing

Personnel
 Ian MacKaye – vocals, guitar
 Guy Picciotto – vocals, guitar
 Joe Lally – bass
 Brendan Canty – drums
 Jerry Busher – second drums on "Number 5"
 Don Zientara, Fugazi – recording at Inner Ear Studios, mixing

References 

Fugazi EPs
2001 EPs
Dischord Records EPs
Albums produced by Don Zientara
Albums produced by Ian MacKaye